The 12th Grey Cup was played on November 29, 1924, before 5,978 fans at Varsity Stadium at Toronto.

Queen's University defeated the Toronto Balmy Beach Beachers 11–3.

External links
 
 

Grey Cup
1924 in Canadian football
Grey Cup, 12th
1924 in Ontario
November 1924 sports events
1920s in Ottawa